Masontown is the name of several places in the United States:

Masontown, Pennsylvania
Masontown, West Virginia